Buell Peninsula is an ice-covered peninsula terminating in Cape Williams, located between the lower ends of Lillie Glacier, George Glacier and Zykov Glacier, at the northwest end of the Anare Mountains, a major mountain range situated in Victoria Land, Antarctica. It was photographed from U.S. Navy aircraft during Operation Highjump, 1946–47, and again in 1960–62. It was mapped by the United States Geological Survey in 1962–63, and named by the Advisory Committee on Antarctic Names for Lieutenant (later Lieutenant Commander) Kenneth R. Buell, a U.S. Navy navigator on aircraft with Squadron VX-6 in Antarctica in 1965–66 and 1966–67. The feature lies situated at the extremity of the Pennell Coast portion of Victoria Land, lying between Cape Williams and Cape Adare.

References 

Peninsulas of Antarctica
Landforms of Victoria Land
Pennell Coast